Christina Baily (born 19 June 1981) is an English actress.

Hailing from Stockport, Christina studied sports science and drama at Manchester Metropolitan University before enrolling at ArtsEd in London, where she received an M.A. Christina starred as the lead in the Award Winning play 'Looking for JJ' with Pilot Theatre Company. She has gone on to play numerous roles in theatre and television. She appeared as Dannii Carbone in the Channel 4 soap opera Hollyoaks in February 2004, and quit the show in 2006. She made a brief return in June 2007. In 2015, Baily fronted an advertisement for Oral B Pro-Expert toothpaste.

Filmography

Television 
Hollyoaks (2004–2007)

References 

 Christina Baily

External links
 

1981 births
Living people
English television actresses
English soap opera actresses
People from Stockport
Alumni of Manchester Metropolitan University
21st-century English actresses
People educated at the Arts Educational Schools